The Sierra Madre ground squirrel (Callospermophilus madrensis) is a species of rodent in the squirrel family. It is endemic to the Sierra Madre Occidental, in northern Mexico. Its natural habitat is subtropical or tropical dry lowland grassland.

See also
Ground squirrels

References

External links

Sierra Madre Ground Squirrel
Endemic mammals of Mexico
Fauna of Northern Mexico
Ground Squirrel
Rodents of North America
Sierra Madre Ground Squirrel
Near threatened biota of Mexico
Near threatened fauna of North America
Taxonomy articles created by Polbot